Jalan Sultan Ismail Petra, Federal Route 259 (formerly Kelantan State Route D28), is a federal road in Kelantan, Malaysia. The roads connected Batang Merbau in the west to Tanah Merah in the east. It was named after ninth Sultan of Kelantan, Sultan Ismail Petra, who reigned from 1979 until 2010.

The kilometre zero of the Federal Route 259 is located at Batang Merbau.

History
In 2014, the highway was gazetted as Federal Route 259.

Features

At most sections, the Federal Route 259 was built under the JKR R5 road standard, allowing maximum speed limit of up to 90 km/h.

List of junctions and towns

References

Malaysian Federal Roads